Year 979 (CMLXXIX) was a common year starting on Wednesday (link will display the full calendar) of the Julian calendar.

Events 
 By place 
 Byzantine Empire 
 March 24 – Second Battle of Pankaleia: An Ibero-Byzantine expeditionary force, under General Bardas Phokas (the Younger), inflicts a crushing defeat on the rebels of General Bardas Skleros, at Sarvenis (modern Turkey). Skleros manages to escape, and finds shelter with his Muslim allies. The rebellion is subdued without difficulty.

 Europe 
 Vitale Candiano, doge of Venice, abdicates for health reasons after a 14-month reign, and retires to a monastery. He is succeeded by Tribuno Memmo, a son-in-law of the murdered Pietro IV Candiano. Tribuno declares a general amnesty for everyone complicit in the plot against Pietro.
 June 8 – Louis V, nicknamed le Fainéant (the Do-Nothing), is crowned as the co-emperor of West Francia at Paris by his father, King Lothair. Upon Lothair's death on March 2, 986, Louis becomes the sole ruler.
 The city of Brussels is founded by Charles, duke of Lower Lorraine. He constructs fortifications (a castrum on an island) on the Senne River (modern Belgium).

 England 
 Tynwald (or Tynwald Court), the parliament of the Isle of Man, is founded. It remains active as the longest continuous parliament in the world.

 Africa 
 Jawhar as-Siqilli is dismissed as vizier of Egypt after an unsuccessful campaign in Syria (near Damascus). He is replaced by Ya'qub ibn Killis.

 China 
 Battle of Gaoliang River: Emperor Tai Zong leads an expedition into You Prefecture (or Youzhou). The Liao Dynasty counter-attacks and defeats the Song forces near modern-day Beijing. 
 Summer – Tai Zong invades the Northern Han and besieges the capital of Taiyuan. A relief force sent by the Liao Dynasty is defeated. The Kingdom is absorbed into the Song Dynasty.

Births 
 August 29 – Otto (or Eudes), French nobleman (d. 1045)
 Al-Muqtana Baha'uddin, Druze religious leader (d. 1043)
 Estrid (or Astrid), queen consort of Sweden (d. 1035)
 Fujiwara no Takaie, Japanese nobleman (d. 1044)
 Ibn al-Samh, Andalusian astronomer (d. 1035)
 Matilda, countess palatine of Lotharingia (d. 1025)

Deaths 
 June 29 – Fujiwara no Koshi, Japanese empress (b. 947)
 August 3 – Thietmar, German nobleman
 August 11 – Gero, German nobleman
 August 26 – Zhao Dezhao, prince of the Song Dynasty (b. 951)
 August 29 – Abu Taghlib, Hamdanid emir
 September 19 – Gotofredo I, archbishop of Milan
unknown dates
 'Imran ibn Shahin, Muslim ruler  
 Vitale Candiano, doge of Venice
 Hasanwayh, Hasanwayhid ruler
probable – Iago ab Idwal, king of Gwynedd

References